Fedak is a surname. Notable people with the surname include:

Jolanta Fedak (1960–2020), Polish politician
Stepan Fedak (1901–1945), Ukrainian activist and failed assassin
Yuliana Fedak (born 1983), Ukrainian tennis player

See also
Sári Fedák (1879–1955), Hungarian actress and singer